Crăciunești (Hungarian: Nyárádkarácson;; , Kretshnif) is a commune in Mureș County, Transylvania, Romania. It is composed of eight villages: Budiu Mic (Hagymásbodon), Ciba (Csiba), Cinta (Fintaháza), Cornești (Somosd), Crăciunești, Foi (Folyfalva), Nicolești (Káposztásszentmiklós) and Tirimioara (Kisteremi). Ciba, Foi and Nicolești were established in 2006.

See also 
 List of Hungarian exonyms (Mureș County)

References

Communes in Mureș County
Localities in Transylvania